Mercedes-Benz 220SE can refer to

Mercedes-Benz W128 (1958-1960) "Ponton"
Mercedes-Benz W111 (1959-1965) as Mercedes-Benz 220SEb "fin-body"